Abdul Karim Bepari is a Bangladesh Awami League politician and the former Member of Parliament of Dhaka-7.

Career
Bepari was a member of the Mukti Bahini and fought in the Bangladesh Liberation war. He was elected to parliament from Dhaka-7 as a Bangladesh Awami League candidate in 1973.

Death
Bepari died on 22 September 2011.

References

Awami League politicians
2011 deaths
1st Jatiya Sangsad members
Mukti Bahini personnel